The Evansville-Dutch Mills Road Bridge is a historic bridge in rural western Washington County, Arkansas. It is a single-span concrete filled-spandrel arch bridge, which carries Dutch Mills Road (County Road 464) over Whitaker Branch South south of the village of Dutch Mills  The bridge was built in 1936 by the Luten Bridge Company, and was one of its last commissions in the county. The bridge was built with a unique Luten Company design that used rings to strengthen the connection between the piers and spandrel walls, enabling a reduced amount of material while maintaining the strength of the bridge.

The bridge was listed on the National Register of Historic Places in 2008.

See also
National Register of Historic Places listings in Washington County, Arkansas
List of bridges on the National Register of Historic Places in Arkansas

References

Road bridges on the National Register of Historic Places in Arkansas
Bridges completed in 1936
National Register of Historic Places in Washington County, Arkansas
Concrete bridges in the United States
Arch bridges in the United States
Transportation in Washington County, Arkansas
1936 establishments in Arkansas
Luten bridges